The Ansaldo A.120, sometimes called the FIAT A.120 since FIAT (Fabbrica Italiana Automobili Torino - Italian Automobile Factory of Turin) bought Ansaldo, was a reconnaissance aircraft developed in Italy in the 1920s.

Design and development
The A.120 was a conventional, parasol-wing monoplane with fixed tailskid undercarriage which accommodated the pilot and observer in tandem open cockpits. The design was based on a wing developed for the Ansaldo A.115 and the fuselage of the Dewoitine D.1 fighters that Ansaldo had built under licence. The type was operated in modest quantities by the Italian Air Force, and was exported to the air forces of Austria and Lithuania, the latter's machines remaining in service until the Soviet annexation of the country.

Variants
 A.120 - prototype with Lorraine 12Db engine (two built)
 A.120bis - improved version with Fiat A.20 engine
 A.120Ady - definitive production version, most with Fiat A.22 engine (57 built)
 A.120R - revised version for Austrian service (six built)

Operators

Austrian Air Force (1927-1938)

Regia Aeronautica

Lithuanian Air Force, 20 aircraft, 1928-1940, 3rd sqn. (Kaunas) 4th sqn. (Kaunas)

Specifications (A.120Ady) 

Note: Lithuanian A.120's had two rear machine guns.

See also

References

 
 Уголок неба

Ansaldo A.120
1920s Italian military reconnaissance aircraft
Parasol-wing aircraft
Single-engined tractor aircraft
Aircraft first flown in 1925